Laidlaw is a Scottish surname. Notable people with the surname include:

Alex Laidlaw (1877–1933), Scottish sportsman
Anna Robena Laidlaw (1819–1901), British pianist
Bill Laidlaw (1914–1941), Scottish professional golfer
Sir Christophor Laidlaw (1922–2010), British businessman
Chris Laidlaw (born 1943), New Zealand rugby union player, public servant, diplomat, radio host and politician
Clyde Laidlaw (born 1933), Australian rules footballer
Daniel Laidlaw (1875–1950), Scottish piper, recipient of the Victoria Cross
Diana Laidlaw (born 1951), South Australian politician
Don Laidlaw (1923–2009), South Australian politician, father of Diana
Ethan Laidlaw (1899–1963), American actor
Frank Fortescue Laidlaw (1876–1963), British biologist
Frank Laidlaw (born 1940), Scottish rugby union player
George Laidlaw (1828–1889), British-Canadian businessman
Greig Laidlaw (born 1985), Scottish rugby union player
Harriet Burton Laidlaw (1873–1949), American social reformer and suffragist
Irvine Laidlaw, Baron Laidlaw (born 1942), Scottish businessman
James Laidlaw (1822–1905), multiple people
Joe Laidlaw (born 1950), English footballer
John Coleman Laidlaw (1921–2015), Canadian endocrinologist
John Laidlaw (born 1936), English footballer
Lorna Laidlaw (born 1963), English actress and television presenter
Kevin Laidlaw (born 1934), New Zealand rugby union player
Marc Laidlaw (born 1960), American writer
Matthew Laidlaw (born 1987), Australian rules footballer
Patrick Laidlaw (1881–1940), Scottish virologist
Paul Laidlaw (born 1967), Scottish auctioneer and television personality
Sir Robert Laidlaw (MP) (1856–1915), British philanthropist, entrepreneur and politician
Robert Laidlaw (1885–1971), New Zealand businessman
Ross Laidlaw (author), Scottish writer, active since 1979
Ross Laidlaw (born 1992), Scottish football goalkeeper
Roy Laidlaw (born 1953), Scottish rugby union player
Stuart Laidlaw (1877–1960), Canadian lacrosse player
Thomas Laidlaw (politician) (1813–1876), Scottish-born Australian politician
Thomas Kennedy Laidlaw (1864–1943), Irish racehorse owner
Tom Laidlaw (born 1958), Canadian ice hockey player
William Laidlaw (poet) (1780–1845), Scottish poet
William G. Laidlaw (1840–1908), U.S. Representative from New York

Scottish surnames